USNS Powhatan (T-ATF-166) was a United States Navy  in service from 1979 to 1999.

Powhatan was laid down on 30 September 1976 by the Marinette Marine Corporation at Marinette, Wisconsin. Launched on 24 June 1978, and delivered to the U.S. Navy on 15 June 1979, Powhatan was assigned to the Military Sealift Command (MSC), and placed in non-commissioned service as USNS Powhatan (T-ATF-166) in 1979.

Powhatan was taken out of service on 26 February 1999 and leased to Donjon Marine Company, Inc., of Hillside, New Jersey, for commercial service, subject to recall by the Navy.

Turkish Navy
Upon completion of the lease, Powhatan was struck from the Naval Vessel Register on 25 February 2008 and sold to Turkey on 26 February 2008 through the Security Assistance Program. Due to her poor condition upon termination of the lease, she underwent a refit which included complete rebuilding of all engines and generators at Charleston, South Carolina. During the refit, the ex-Powhatan was commissioned into the Turkish Navy as TCG Inebolu (A-590).

Inebolu was involved in the search and rescue operations for the downed Turkish F-4 reconnaissance jet in the eastern Mediterranean Sea. The aircraft was shot down by Syrian Armed Forces in international airspace on 22 June 2012 killing two pilots.

In 2020, damaged Bangladesh Navy corvette BNS Bijoy towed by TCG İnebolu to Turkey for repairs in Aksaz Naval Base. BNS Bijoy was damaged during the 2020 Beirut explosion.

References

External links

 NavSource Online: Service Ship Photo Archive: USNS Powhatan (T-ATF-166)

 

Tugs of the United States Navy
Cold War auxiliary ships of the United States
Ships built by Marinette Marine
1978 ships
Ships transferred from the United States Navy to the Turkish Navy